Rulman Merswin (c. 1307 - 1382) was a German mystic, leader for a time of the Friends of God.

Life
Born into an important family in Strasbourg, at the time a free city of the Holy Roman Empire, Rulman Merswin became a banker and amassed a large fortune. Always “a man of watchful conscience and of great fear of God,” he gave up business at age 40, “took leave of the world,” and devoted himself to God as a layman, after the manner of the Franciscan Tertiaries, or the Waldensians. Embarking on his new spiritual life, Merswin was moved to keep his money “to use for God,” a decision which precipitated an experience of ecstasy; he felt himself float off the ground and fly around the garden.

Although married to Gertrude of Bietenheim, Merswin resolved to remain celibate. This led to struggles against evil temptation, which he tried to quell through extreme ascetic practices. On the advice of Johannes Tauler, his confessor, Merswin gave up self-mortification. He then fell into severe depression, convinced he was destined for eternal damnation in the fires of Hell; however, he persevered and found, “the joy and peace of the Holy Spirit.” He heard voices and often fell into states of ecstasy. In The Story of the First Four Years of a New Life (which his secretary, Nikolaus von Löwen, claimed was found in a locked cabinet after Merswin's death), Merswin recounts a meeting with a mysterious Friend of God from the Oberland, a confessor, prophet and teacher, to whom Merswin submitted himself completely.

Johannes Tauler brought Merswin into the Friends of God, a lay religious society with a mystical focus.

In 1367, Merswin purchased an old cloister on an island near Strasbourg to serve as a refuge for study for the Friends of God and as a “school of prophets.” The house, which he called "das grüne Wört" or Grünenwörth ("the green island"), produced a number of mystical texts, such as the Book of the Nine Rocks. Many of the works were attributed to The Friend of God from the Oberland, although probably written by Merswin himself. In 1371, Grünenwörth was put under the care of the Knights of St. John.

The Friends of God, as led by Tauler and Henry Suso, sought a mystical path in line with established Catholic doctrine, following Thomas Aquinas. Rulman Merswin, under the guidance of The Friend of God from the Oberland, wanted to purify the Church. This stress on reform brought The Friends of God into conflict with the Church and not long after Merswin's death in 1382, they were condemned.

See also

 Christian Mysticism
 Theologia Germanica

Notes

External links 
 a text containing some biographical information.
 The Friends of God
 Entry on "Friends of God" in the Catholic Encyclopedia
 Rulman Merswin (in French)
 http://wn.rsarchive.org/Books/GA007/English/GA007_About.html

Year of birth uncertain
1382 deaths
14th-century Christian mystics
Roman Catholic mystics